Marymont is a historic mansion in Murfreesboro, Tennessee, U.S.. It was built in 1860-1861 for Hiram Jenkins. In 1878, it was inherited by his niece, Nimmie Jenkins, and her husband, Dr. J. J. Rucker. They named the house after their daughter, Mary Rucker.

The house was designed in the Classical Revival architectural style, with Roman Revival finishes. It has been listed on the National Register of Historic Places since October 30, 1973.

References

Houses on the National Register of Historic Places in Tennessee
Houses completed in 1861
Neoclassical architecture in Tennessee
Buildings and structures in Murfreesboro, Tennessee